Lydia Campbell  (November 1, 1818 – April 1905), born to an Inuit mother and an English father, was an early diarist in Labrador. She is one of Labrador's best known historical figures and writers, affectionately known as "Aunt Lydia".<ref>{{cite web |url=https://www.mun.ca/labmetis/pdf/stopp_1.pdf |title=I, old Lydia Campbell": a Labrador Woman of National Historic Significance |publisher=Memorial University |last=Stopp |first=Marianne |date=June 27, 2011 |access-date=March 29, 2013}}</ref>

She was born in Hamilton Inlet, Gross Water (Groswater Bay), Labrador, to Ambrose Brooks, a native of England who was employed with the Hudson's Bay Company, and Susan, his Inuit wife. She was home-schooled by her father. She was married twice: first to William Ambrose Blake in 1834, with whom she had five children, and later to Daniel Campbell with whom she had eight children. In 1894, Arthur Charles Waghorne, a clergyman, submitted her autobiography for publication; it appeared as Sketches of Labrador Life in the St John's Evening Herald. Campbell died in Mulligan River at the age of 86.

Her great niece, Elizabeth Goudie, wrote Woman of Labrador'', published in 1973. In 2001, the journal of her son, Thomas L. Blake (who died in 1935), was published as a book.

References

Further reading
 Lydia Campbell (biography), published by Université du Québec à Montréal
 Thomas L. Blake (biography), published by Université du Québec à Montréal

External links
 Sketches of Labrador Life

1818 births
1905 deaths
Writers from Newfoundland and Labrador
Persons of National Historic Significance (Canada)
Inuit writers
Inuit women
Canadian memoirists
Canadian women memoirists